The Shiloh Missionary Baptist Church and Rosenwald School is a historic Missionary Baptist Church and Rosenwald School located near 7794 Highway 81, Notasulga, Alabama in Macon County, Alabama.   The property contains two buildings that are both associated with the Tuskegee Syphilis Study.  The church building is a gable-front frame building with a frame bell tower serving as a prominent landmark along the highway.  The building has been sided in vinyl, c. 1990, but the interior of the building retains its c. 1916 appearance, complete with decorative painted graining on doors, pews, wainscoting, and other defining features of the building.  The Rosenwald School, built c. 1922 and remodeled c. 1936, retains its historical and architectural integrity from the 1930s when a New Deal agency expanded the industrial room and made other interior and exterior changes. The Rosenwald School is undergoing renovation as of February 2011. Both buildings have been listed in the Alabama State Historic Register.

One of the most infamous incidents in the medical history of the United States is the study of syphilis, sponsored by the U. S. Public Health Service (USPHS) in Macon County, Alabama, from 1932 to 1973.  It is often called "The Tuskegee Study" because the Macon County seat is Tuskegee and a former hospital at Tuskegee Institute (now university) and the Veterans’ Hospital at Tuskegee were used for some of the medical procedures.  The Shiloh Missionary Baptist Church is located about 8 miles north of Tuskegee, Alabama.

Notices would be sent to subject of the Tuskegee Syphilis Study.  They were instructed to meet at a central location to be picked up for testing.  A memo from the USPHS details where these roundups between test doctors and USPHS official took place.  The memo stated "The Government will be here next week.  Be sure to meet him at the time a place listed below that is nearest your home." The rural location were a combination of churches, schools, and crossroads stores.  The Shiloah Missionary Baptist Church was one gathering location.

The buildings and adjacent cemetery were added to the Alabama Register of Landmarks and Heritage on September 20, 2006.  They were subsequently added to the National Register of Historic Places on August 6, 2010.

References

Notes
Public Health Service to Dear Sir, October 18, 1955, CDC Papers, Tuskegee Syphilis Study Administrative Records, 1930–80, Box 16, Folder Alabama-Misc., National Archives, Southeast Region.
James J. Jones, Bad Blood:  The Tuskegee Syphilis Experiment (New York: Basic Books, 1993).
Reberby, Tuskegee Truths
The National Archives:  https://www.archives.gov/research/arc/index.html  All of the digitized materials can be pulled up using search term "Tuskegee Syphilis Study".  Individual items of interest can be pulled up by ID number:  956091, 956107, 824600, 956126, 956102, 824607

School buildings on the National Register of Historic Places in Alabama
National Register of Historic Places in Macon County, Alabama
Buildings and structures in Macon County, Alabama
Baptist churches in Alabama
Properties on the Alabama Register of Landmarks and Heritage
Rosenwald schools in Alabama
Historically segregated African-American schools in Alabama